Odaliana Gómez (born 16 June 2004) is an American-raised Dominican Republic footballer who plays as a goalkeeper for high school team Hasbrouck Heights Aviators, the Match Fit Academy under–17 team and the Dominican Republic women's national team.

Early life
Gómez was raised in Hasbrouck Heights, New Jersey.

High school and college career
Gómez has attended the Hasbrouck Heights High School in Hasbrouck Heights, New Jersey. She has committed to the University of Delaware in Newark, Delaware.

International career
Gómez made her senior debut for the Dominican Republic on 18 February 2021 in a friendly home match against Puerto Rico.

References

2004 births
Living people
Dominican Republic women's footballers
Women's association football goalkeepers
Dominican Republic women's international footballers
Hasbrouck Heights High School alumni
People from Hasbrouck Heights, New Jersey
Sportspeople from Bergen County, New Jersey
Soccer players from New Jersey
American women's soccer players
American sportspeople of Dominican Republic descent
African-American women's soccer players
21st-century African-American sportspeople
21st-century African-American women